Capon Springs, also known as Frye's Springs and Watson Town, is a national historic district  in Capon Springs, West Virginia that includes a number of resort buildings ranging in age from the mid-nineteenth century to the early 20th century. The area grew around a mineral spring discovered by Henry Frye in the 1760s, so that by 1787 the town of Watson had been established. By 1850, the 168-room Mountain House Hotel had been built, enduring until it burned in 1911. Also in 1850, the state of Virginia built Greek Revival bath pavilions and the President's House. A period of decline followed the Mountain House fire, but rebuilding began in the 1930s under the ownership of Louis Austin. The resort is still in Austin family ownership.

The resort was placed on the National Register of Historic Places in 1994.

In 2013, the resort was named West Virginia's Family-Owned Business of the Year.

See also
List of historic sites in Hampshire County, West Virginia

References

External links
 Official website

Buildings and structures in Hampshire County, West Virginia
Destination spas
Golf clubs and courses in West Virginia
Greek Revival architecture in West Virginia
Historic districts in Hampshire County, West Virginia
Hotel buildings on the National Register of Historic Places in West Virginia
National Register of Historic Places in Hampshire County, West Virginia
Resorts in West Virginia
Vernacular architecture in West Virginia
Victorian architecture in West Virginia
Tourist attractions in Hampshire County, West Virginia
Historic districts on the National Register of Historic Places in West Virginia
Public baths on the National Register of Historic Places
Public baths in the United States